Jon-Jon Trevor Smuts (born 21 September 1988) is a South African cricketer who plays for the Warriors in the South African domestic competitions. He is a right-handed opening batsman and a slow left-arm bowler. In 2010 he was selected for the South African Emerging Players' squad to tour Australia. In the 2018 South African Cricket Annual, he was named as one of the five Cricketers of the Year. He is the brother of cricket player Kelly Smuts.

Domestic and T20 career
In the 2010/11 South African domestic season he was named the Chevrolet Warriors cricketer of the season. He was included in the Eastern Province cricket team squad for the 2015 Africa T20 Cup.

In October 2018, he was named in Nelson Mandela Bay Giants' squad for the first edition of the Mzansi Super League T20 tournament. He was the leading run-scorer for the team in the tournament, with 219 runs in nine matches.

In July 2019, he was selected to play for the Glasgow Giants in the inaugural edition of the Euro T20 Slam cricket tournament. However, the following month the tournament was cancelled. In September 2019, he was named in the squad for the Nelson Mandela Bay Giants team for the 2019 Mzansi Super League tournament. In April 2021, he was named in Eastern Province's squad, ahead of the 2021–22 cricket season in South Africa.

International career
In January 2017 he was included in South Africa's Twenty20 International (T20I) squad for their series against Sri Lanka. He made his T20I debut for South Africa against Sri Lanka on 20 January 2017. In August 2017, he was named in Nelson Mandela Bay Stars' squad for the first season of the T20 Global League. However, in October 2017, Cricket South Africa initially postponed, and later cancelled the tournament. In January 2020, he was selected for South Africa's One Day International (ODI) squad for their series against England. He made his ODI debut on 4 February 2020, for South Africa against England.

References

External links
 

1988 births
Living people
People from Makhanda, Eastern Cape
Cricketers from the Eastern Cape
South African cricketers
South Africa One Day International cricketers
South Africa Twenty20 International cricketers
Eastern Province cricketers
Warriors cricketers
St Kitts and Nevis Patriots cricketers
Nelson Mandela Bay Giants cricketers
KwaZulu-Natal cricketers